HD 41248 is a star in the constellation Pictor. It is a star very similar to the Sun, with the same spectral type (G2V). It has 68% of the Sun's luminosity, 92% of its mass and 78% of its diameter. It is estimated to be around 2 billion years old, and it has a lower metallicity—43% that of the Sun. With an apparent visual magnitude of 8.81, it is too faint to be seen with the unaided eye, and is located around 170 light-years (52 parsecs) away from the Solar System.

HD 41248 was investigated in the High Accuracy Radial Velocity Planet Searcher (HARPS) and initially thought not to have planets, but review of its spectrum showed it to have two super-earths with orbital periods of 18.357 days and 25.648 days and minimum masses 12.3 and 8.6 times that of the Earth. The planets are in a 7:5 mean motion resonance. The existence of the planets has been called into question as being a possible false detection due to stellar activity, with a cycle of 25 days related to the star's rotational period. The original researchers conceded small planet signals could be difficult to unravel from signal noise and noted that the star had become more active in recent years, but in reanalysing all the data concluded that the stability of the radial velocity signals over ten years strengthened the case for the planet hypothesis. They add that more conclusive proof could come as instruments operating in the near infrared such as CARMENES or the Habitable Zone Planet Finder (HPF) become operational.

References

Pictor (constellation)
G-type main-sequence stars
041248
028460
Durchmusterung objects